Eric Schickler (born June 9, 1969) is an American political scientist, currently the Jeffrey & Ashley McDermott Endowed Chair at University of California, Berkeley and an Elected Fellow of the American Academy of Arts & Sciences.

In 2013, Schickler received the Warren J. Mitofsky Award for Excellence in Public Opinion Research from the Board of Directors of the Roper Center for Public Opinion Research at Cornell University.

References

1969 births
Living people
University of California, Berkeley faculty
American political scientists
New College of Florida alumni
Yale University alumni